Ctesiphon (Middle Persian: 𐭲𐭩𐭮𐭯𐭥𐭭 tyspwn or tysfwn; ; ,) was an ancient city, located on the eastern bank of the Tigris,  about  southeast of present-day Baghdad. Ctesiphon served as a royal capital of the empires in the Parthian and Sasanian eras for over eight hundred years. Ctesiphon was capital of the Sasanian Empire from 226–637 until the Muslim conquest of Persia in 651 AD.

Ctesiphon developed into a rich commercial metropolis, merging with the surrounding cities along both shores of the river, including the Hellenistic city of Seleucia. Ctesiphon and its environs were therefore sometimes referred to as "The Cities" (Aramaic: Mahuza, al-Mada'in). In the late sixth and early seventh century, it was listed as the largest city in the world by some accounts.

During the Roman–Parthian Wars, Ctesiphon fell three times to the Romans, and later fell twice during Sasanian rule. It was also the site of the Battle of Ctesiphon in 363 AD. After the Muslim invasion, the city fell into decay and was depopulated by the end of the eighth century, its place as a political and economic center taken by the Abbasid capital at Baghdad. The most conspicuous structure remaining today is the Taq Kasra, sometimes called the Archway of Ctesiphon.

Names 
The Latin name  derives from Ancient Greek . This is ostensibly a Greek toponym based on a personal name, although it may be a Hellenized form of a local name, reconstructed as Tisfōn or Tisbōn. In Iranian-language texts of the Sasanian era, it is spelled as tyspwn, which can be read as Tīsfōn, Tēsifōn, etc. in Manichaean Parthian 𐫤𐫏𐫘𐫛𐫇𐫗, in Middle Persian 𐭲𐭩𐭮𐭯𐭥𐭭 and in Christian Sogdian (in Syriac alphabet) languages. The New Persian form is Tisfun.

In modern Arabic, the name is usually Ṭaysafūn or Qaṭaysfūn or as al-Mada'in ( "The Cities", referring to Greater Ctesiphon). "According to Yāqūt [...], quoting Ḥamza, the original form was Ṭūsfūn or Tūsfūn, which was arabicized as Ṭaysafūn." The Armenian name of the city was Tizbon. Ctesiphon is first mentioned in the Book of Ezra of the Old Testament as Kasfia/Casphia (a derivative of the ethnic name Cas, and a cognate of Caspian and Qazvin). It is also mentioned in the Talmud as Aktisfon. In another Talmudic reference it is written as Akistfon, located across the Tigris River from the city of Ardashir.

Location 

Ctesiphon measured 30 square kilometers, more than twice the surface of 13.7-square-kilometer fourth-century imperial Rome.

The archway of Chosroes (Taq Kasra) was once a part of the royal palace in Ctesiphon and is estimated to date between the 3rd and 6th centuries AD. It is located in what is now the Iraqi town of Salman Pak.

History

Parthian period
Ctesiphon was founded in the late 120s BC. It was built on the site of a military camp established across from Seleucia by Mithridates I of Parthia. The reign of Gotarzes I saw Ctesiphon reach a peak as a political and commercial center. The city became the Empire's capital circa 58 BC during the reign of Orodes II. Gradually, the city merged with the old Hellenistic capital of Seleucia and other nearby settlements to form a cosmopolitan metropolis.

The reason for this westward relocation of the capital could have been in part due to the proximity of the previous capitals (Mithradatkirt, and Hecatompylos at Hyrcania) to the Scythian incursions.

Strabo abundantly describes the foundation of Ctesiphon:

Because of its importance, Ctesiphon was a major military objective for the leaders of the Roman Empire in their eastern wars. The city was captured by Rome five times in its history – three times in the 2nd century alone. The emperor Trajan captured Ctesiphon in 116, but his successor, Hadrian, decided to willingly return Ctesiphon in 117 as part of a peace settlement. The Roman general Avidius Cassius captured Ctesiphon in 164 during another Parthian war, but abandoned it when peace was concluded. In 197, the emperor Septimius Severus sacked Ctesiphon and carried off thousands of its inhabitants, whom he sold into slavery.

Sasanian period

By 226, Ctesiphon was in the hands of the Sasanian Empire, who also made it their capital and had laid an end to the Parthian dynasty of Iran. Ctesiphon was greatly enlarged and flourished during their rule, thus turning into a metropolis, which was known by in Arabic as al-Mada'in, and in Aramaic as Mahoze. The oldest inhabited places of Ctesiphon were on its eastern side, which in Islamic Arabic sources is called "the Old City" ( Madīnah al-'Atīqah), where the residence of the Sasanians, known as the White Palace, was located. The southern side of Ctesiphon was known as Asbānbar or Aspānbar, which was known by its prominent halls, riches, games, stables, and baths. Taq Kasra was located in the latter.

The western side was known as Veh-Ardashir (meaning "the good city of Ardashir" in Middle Persian), known as Mahoza by the Jews, Kokhe by the Christians, and Behrasir by the Arabs. Veh-Ardashir was populated by many wealthy Jews, and was the seat of the church of the Nestorian patriarch. To the south of Veh-Ardashir was Valashabad. Ctesiphon had several other districts which were named Hanbu Shapur, Darzanidan, Veh Jondiu-Khosrow, Nawinabad and Kardakadh.

Severus Alexander advanced towards Ctesiphon in 233, but as corroborated by Herodian, his armies suffered a humiliating defeat against Ardashir I. In 283, emperor Carus sacked the city uncontested during a period of civil upheaval. In 295, emperor Galerius was defeated outside the city. However, he returned a year later with a vengeance and won a victory which ended in the fifth and final capture of the city by the Romans in 299. He returned it to the Persian king Narses in exchange for Armenia and western Mesopotamia. In c. 325 and again in 410, the city, or the Greek colony directly across the river, was the site of church councils for the Church of the East.

After the conquest of Antioch in 541, Khosrau I built a new city near Ctesiphon for the inhabitants he captured. He called this new city Weh Antiok Khusrau, or literally, "better than Antioch Khosrau built this". Local inhabitants of the area called the new city Rumagan, meaning "town of the Romans" and Arabs called the city al-Rumiyya. Along with Weh Antiok, Khosrau built a number of fortified cities. After a campaign in 573, John of Ephesus wrote that no fewer than 292,000 persons had been deported from Dara, Apamia, and other Syrian towns to Veh-Antiokh. John would later cite a letter stating no more than 30,000 prisoners were deported. It's thought that the first number he gave is not to be taken literally.

In 590, a member of the House of Mihran, Bahram Chobin repelled the newly ascended Sasanian ruler Khosrau II from Iraq, and conquered the region. One year later, Khosrau II, with aid from the Byzantine Empire, reconquered his domains. During his reign, some of the great fame of al-Mada'in decreased, due to the popularity of Khosrau's new winter residence, Dastagerd. In 627, the Byzantine Emperor Heraclius surrounded the city, the capital of the Sassanid Empire, leaving it after the Persians accepted his peace terms. In 628, a deadly plague hit Ctesiphon, al-Mada'in and the rest of the western part of the Sasanian Empire, which even killed Khosrau's son and successor, Kavadh II.

In 629, Ctesiphon was briefly under the control of Mihranid usurper Shahrbaraz, but the latter was shortly assassinated by the supporters of Khosrau II's daughter Borandukht. Ctesiphon then continued to be involved in constant fighting between two factions of the Sasanian Empire, the Pahlav (Parthian) faction under the House of Ispahbudhan and the Parsig (Persian) faction under Piruz Khosrow.

Downfall of the Sasanians and the Islamic conquests

In the mid-630s, the Muslim Arabs, who had invaded the territories of the Sasanian Empire, defeated them during a great battle known as the Battle of al-Qādisiyyah. The Arabs then attacked Ctesiphon, and occupied it in early 637.

The Muslim military officer Sa`d ibn Abi Waqqas quickly seized Valashabad and made a peace treaty with the inhabitants of Weh Antiok Khusrau and Veh-Ardashir. The terms of the treaty were that the inhabitants of Weh Antiok Khusrau were allowed to leave if they wanted to, but if they did not, they were forced to acknowledge Muslim authority, and also pay tribute (jizya). Later on, when the Muslims arrived at Ctesiphon, it was completely desolated, due to flight of the Sasanian royal family, nobles, and troops. However, the Muslims had managed to take some of troops captive, and many riches were seized from the Sasanian treasury and were given to the Muslim troops. Furthermore, the throne hall in Taq Kasra was briefly used as a mosque.

Still, as political and economic fortune had passed elsewhere, the city went into a rapid decline, especially after the founding of the Abbasid capital at Baghdad in the 760s, and soon became a ghost town. Caliph Al-Mansur took much of the required material for the construction of Baghdad from the ruins of Ctesiphon. He also attempted to demolish the palace and reuse its bricks for his own palace, but he desisted only when the undertaking proved too vast. Al-Mansur also used the al-Rumiya town as the Abbasid capital city for a few months.

It is believed to be the basis for the city of Isbanir in One Thousand and One Nights.

Modern era
The ruins of Ctesiphon were the site of a major battle of World War I in November 1915. The Ottoman Empire defeated troops of Britain attempting to capture Baghdad, and drove them back some  before trapping the British force and compelling it to surrender.

Population and religion 
Under Sasanian rule, the population of Ctesiphon was heavily mixed: it included Arameans, Persians, Greeks and Assyrians. Several religions were also practiced in the metropolis, which included Christianity, Judaism and Zoroastrianism. In 497, the first Nestorian patriarch Mar Babai I, fixed his see at Seleucia-Ctesiphon, supervising their mission east, with the Merv metropolis as pivot. The population also included Manicheans, a dualist church, who continued to be mentioned in Ctesiphon during Umayyad rule fixing their "patriarchate of Babylon" there. Much of the population fled from Ctesiphon after the Arab capture of the metropolis. However, a portion of Persians remained there, and some important figures of these people are known to have provided Ali with presents, which he, however, refused to take. In the ninth century, the surviving Manicheans fled and displaced their patriarchate up the Silk Road, in Samarkand.

Archaeology 
A German Oriental Society led by Oscar Reuther excavated at Ctesiphon in 1928–29 mainly at Qasr bint al-Qadi on the western part of the site. In winter of 1931–1932 a joint expedition of the German State Museums (Staatliche Museen zu Berlin) and The Metropolitan Museum of Art continued excavations at the site, focusing on the areas of Ma'aridh, Tell Dheheb, the Taq-i Kisra, Selman Pak and Umm ez-Za'tir under the direction of Ernst Kühnel.

In the late 1960s and early 1970s, an Italian team from the University of Turin directed by Antonio Invernizzi and  worked at the site, which they identified not as Ctesiphon but as Veh Ardashir. Work mainly concentrated on restoration at the palace of Khosrau II. In 2013, the Iraqi government contracted to restore the Taq Kasra, as a tourist attraction.

Gallery

See also 
 Opis
 Persian Empire
 Cities of the ancient Near East
 Rachae
 School of Seleucia-Ctesiphon

References

Bibliography
 M. Streck, Die alte Landschaft Babylonien nach den arabischen Geographen, 2 vols. (Leiden, 1900–1901).
 M. Streck, "Seleucia und Ktesiphon," Der Alte Orient, 16 (1917), 1–64.
 A. Invernizzi, "Ten Years Research in the al-Madain Area, Seleucia and Ctesiphon," Sumer, 32, (1976), 167–175.
 Luise Abramowski, "Der Bischof von Seleukia-Ktesiphon als Katholikos und Patriarch der Kirche des Ostens," in Dmitrij Bumazhnov u. Hans R. Seeliger (hg), Syrien im 1.-7. Jahrhundert nach Christus. Akten der 1. Tübinger Tagung zum Christlichen Orient (15.-16. Juni 2007). (Tübingen, Mohr Siebeck, 2011) (Studien und Texte zu Antike und Christentum / Studies and Texts in Antiquity and Christianity, 62),

External links

 Ctesiphon and Taq Kasra photo gallery
 Ctesiphon Exhibition by the Islamic Art Museum at the Pergamon Museum in Berlin in 2016 (Video)
 Livius.org: Ctesiphon 
 Ctesiphon (profile at the Metropolitan Museum of Art)

 
Baghdad Governorate
Archaeological sites in Iraq
Twin cities
Parthian cities
Sasanian cities
Ancient history of Iraq
Former populated places in Iraq
Populated places along the Silk Road
120s BC establishments
Places in Shahnameh